A Borjigin is a member of the Mongol sub-clan, which started with Bodonchar Munkhag of the Kiyat clan. Yesugei's descendants were thus said to be Kiyat-Borjigin. The senior Borjigids provided ruling princes for Mongolia and Inner Mongolia until the 20th century. The clan formed the ruling class among the Mongols and some other peoples of Central Asia and Eastern Europe. Today, the Borjigid are found in most of Mongolia, Inner Mongolia and Xinjiang, and additionally genetic research has shown that descent from Genghis Khan and Amir Timur Barlas is common throughout Central Asia and other regions.

Origin and name 

The patrilineage began with Blue-grey Wolf (Börte Chino) and Fallow Doe (Gua Maral). According to The Secret History of the Mongols, their 11th generation descendant Dobu Mergen's widow Alan Gua the Fair was impregnated by a ray of light. Her youngest son became the ancestor of the later Borjigid. He was Bodonchar Munkhag, who along with his brothers sired the entire Mongol nation. According to Rashid-al-Din Hamadani, many of the older Mongolian clans were founded by members of the Borjigin — Barlas, Urud, Manghud, Taichiut, Chonos, Kiyat, etc. The first Khan of the Mongol was Bodonchar Munkhag's great-great-grandson Khaidu Khan. Khaidu's grandsons Khabul Khan and Ambaghai Khan (founder of the Taichiut clan) succeeded him. Thereafter, Khabul's sons, Hotula Khan and Yesugei, and Khabul's grandson Temujin (Genghis Khan, son of Yesugei) ruled the Khamag Mongol. By the unification of the Mongols in 1206, virtually all of Temujin's uncles and first cousins had died, and from then on only the descendants of Yesugei Baghatur, his brother Daritai, and nephew Onggur formed the Borjigid.

According to Paul Pelliot and Louis Hambis, Rashid al-Din Hamadani once explained that "borčïqïn" designated in the Turkic languages a man with dark-blue eyes, and did so again without mentioning the said language, adding that Yesugei's children and the majority of their own children had had such eyes per coincidence, also recalling that the genie which had impregnated Alan Gua after her husband's death had had dark-blue eyes ("ašhal čašm"). Abu al-Ghazi Bahadur later paraphrased Hamadani by relating that Yesugei's eyes were dark-blue ("شهلا šahlā"), that the Mongols ("Moɣol") called such eyes "borǰïɣïn" (بورجغن), that his sons and most of their descendants had dark-blue eyes ("ašhal"), and that one recognized thus in Yesugei's lineage the characteristic sign of the genie which had visited Alan Gua and had "borǰïɣïn" eyes, adding that the Arabs called "ašhal" a man whose iris ("bübäčik") was black, cornea white ("aq"), and whose limbal ring was red.

History 

The Borjigin family ruled over the Mongol Empire from the 13th to 14th century. The rise of Genghis Khan narrowed the scope of the Borjigid-Kiyad clans sharply. This separation was emphasized by the intermarriage of Genghis's descendants with the Barlas, Baarin, Manghud and other branches of the original Borjigid. In the western regions of the Empire, the Jurkin and perhaps other lineages near to Genghis's lineage used the clan name Kiyad but did not share in the privileges of the Genghisids. The Borjigit clan had once dominated large lands stretching from Java to Iran and from Indo-China to Novgorod. In 1335, with the disintegration of the Ilkhanate in Iran, the first of numerous non-Borjigid-Kiyad dynasties appeared. Established by marriage partners of Genghisids, these included the Suldus Chupanids, Jalayirids in the Middle East, the Barulas dynasties in Chagatai Khanate and India, the Manghud and Onggirat dynasties in the Golden Horde and Central Asia, and the Oirats in western Mongolia.

In 1368, during the reign of Toghun Temür (Emperor Huizong of Yuan), the Yuan dynasty was overthrown by the Ming dynasty but members of the family continued to rule over northern China and the Mongolian Plateau into the 17th century, known as the Northern Yuan dynasty. Descendants of Genghis Khan's brothers, Hasar and Belgutei, surrendered to the Ming in the 1380s. By 1470 the Borjigin lines were severely weakened, and the Mongolian Plateau was almost in chaos.

Post-Mongol Empire 

After the breakup of the Golden Horde, the Khiyat continued to rule the Crimea and Kazan until the late 18th century. They were annexed by the Russian Empire and the Chinese. In Mongolia, the Kublaids reigned as Khagan of the Mongols, however, descendants of Ögedei and Ariq Böke usurped the throne briefly.

Under Dayan Khan (1480–1517) a broad Borjigid revival reestablished Borjigid supremacy among the Mongols proper. His descendants proliferated to become a new ruling class. The Borjigin clan was the strongest of the 49 Mongol banners from which the Bontoi clan proper supported and fought for their Khan and for their honor. The eastern Khorchins were under the Hasarids, and the Ongnigud, Abagha Mongols were under the Belguteids and Temüge Odchigenids. A fragment of the Hasarids deported to Western Mongolia became the Khoshuts.

The Qing dynasty respected the Borjigin family and the early emperors married the Hasarid Borjigids of the Khorchin. Even among the pro-Qing Mongols, traces of the alternative tradition survived. Aci Lomi, a banner general, wrote his History of the Borjigid Clan in 1732–35. The 18th century and 19th century Qing nobility was adorned by the descendants of the early Mongol adherents including the Borjigin.

Asian dynasties descended from Genghis Khan included the Yuan dynasty of China, the Ilkhanids of Persia, the Jochids of the Golden Horde, the Shaybanids of Siberia, and the Astrakhanids of Central Asia. As a rule, the Genghisid descent played a crucial role in Tatar politics. For instance, Mamai had to exercise his authority through a succession of puppet khans but could not assume the title of khan himself because he lacked Genghisid lineage.

The word "Chingisid" derives from the name of the Mongol conqueror Genghis (Chingis) Khan (c. 1162–1227 CE). Genghis and his successors created a vast empire stretching from the Sea of Japan to the Black Sea.

 The Chingisid principle, or golden lineage, was the rule of inheritance laid down in the (Yassa), the legal code attributed to Genghis Khan.
 A Chingisid prince was one who could trace direct descent from Genghis Khan in the male line, and who could therefore claim high respect in the Mongol, Turkic and Asiatic world.
 The Chingisid states were the successor states or Khanates after the Mongol empire broke up following the death of the Genghis Khan's sons and their successors.
 The term Chingisid people was used to describe the people of Genghis Khan's armies who came in contact with Europeans. It applied primarily the Golden Horde, led by Batu Khan, a grandson of Genghis. Members of the Horde were predominantly Oghuz — Turkic-speaking people rather than Mongols. (Although the aristocracy was largely Mongol, Mongols were never more than a small minority in the armies and the lands they conquered.) Europeans often (incorrectly) called the people of the Golden Horde "Tartars".

Babur and Humayun, founders of the Mughal Empire in India, asserted their authority as Chinggisids. Because they claimed descent through their maternal lineage, they had never used the clan name Borjigin.

The Genghisids also include such dynasties and houses as Giray, House of Siberia, Ar begs, Yaushev family and other.

The last ruling monarch of Genghisid ancestry, Maqsud Shah (d. 1930), Khan of Kumul from 1908 to 1930.

Modern relevance 
The Borjigin held power over Mongolia for many centuries (even during Qing period) and only lost power when Communists took control in the 20th century. Aristocratic descent was something to be forgotten in the socialist period. Joseph Stalin's associates executed some 30,000 Mongols including Borjigin nobles in a series of campaigns against their culture and religion. Clan association has lost its practical relevance in the 20th century, but is still considered a matter of honour and pride by many Mongolians. In 1920s the communist regime banned the use of clan names. When the ban was lifted again in 1997, and people were told they had to have surnames, most families had lost knowledge about their clan association. Because of that, a disproportionate number of families registered the most prestigious clan name Borjigin, many of them without historic justification. The label Borjigin is used as a measure of cultural supremacy.

In Inner Mongolia, the Borjigid or Kiyad name became the basis for many Chinese surnames adopted by ethnic Inner Mongols. The Inner Mongolian Borjigin Taijis took the surname Bao (from Borjigid) and in Ordos Qi (Qiyat). A genetic research has proposed that as many as 16 million men from populations as far apart as Hazaras in the West and Hezhe people to the east may have Borjigid-Kiyad ancestry. The Qiyat clan name is still found among the Kazakhs, Uzbeks and Karakalpaks.

Prominent Kiyads or Borjigins

Rulers of the Khamag Mongol (11th century – 1206) 
Khaidu
Khabul Khan
Yesugei

Emperors and rulers of the Mongol Empire (1206–1368)
Genghis Khan
Tolui Khan
Ögedei Khan
Güyük Khan
Möngke Khan
Kublai Khan

Genghis Khan's brothers
Hasar
Belgutei
Temüge

Rulers of the Khanates

Yuan dynasty
Kublai Khan
Temür Khan
Toghon Temür Khan

Golden Horde

Jochi
Orda Khan
Batu Khan
Sartaq
Berke
Shiban
Toqta
Uzbeg Khan

Ilkhanate
Hulagu
Abaqa
Ghazan

Chagatai Khanate
Chagatai Khan
Kaidu
Duwa
Esen Buqa I
Kebek
Tarmashirin

Post-Mongol Empire Golden Horde (1360–1502)
Urus Khan
Toqtamish
Mamai
Olug Moxammat

Crimean Khanate (1441–1783)
Mengli Giray

Kazan Khanate (1438–1552)
Olug Moxammat

Uzbek Khanate (1428–1471)
Abu'l-Khayr Khan

Kazakh Khanate (1456–1847)
Janybek Khan

Northern Yuan dynasty (1368–1635) 
Öljei Temür Khan
Dayan Khan
Ligdan Khan
Ejei Khan

Ruler of the Tumed 
Altan Khan

Khalkha 
Zanabazar

Gallery

Yuan dynasty family tree 

Genghis Khan founded the Mongol Empire in 1206. His grandson, Kublai Khan, after defeating his younger brother and rival claimant to the throne Ariq Böke, founded the Yuan dynasty of China in 1271. The dynasty was overthrown by the Ming dynasty during the reign of Toghon Temür in 1368, but it survived in the Mongolian Plateau, known as the Northern Yuan dynasty. Although the throne was usurped by Esen Taishi of the Oirats in 1453, he was overthrown in the next year. A recovery of the khaganate was achieved by Dayan Khan, but the territory was segmented by his descendants. The last khan Ligden died in 1634 and his son Ejei Khongor submitted himself to Hong Taiji the next year, ending the Northern Yuan regime. However, the Borjigin nobles continued to rule their subjects until the 20th century under the Qing dynasty.

Or in a different version (years of reign over the Northern Yuan dynasty [up to 1388] are given in brackets).

See also 

Family tree of Genghis Khan
History of Mongolia
Mongolian name
List of medieval Mongolian tribes and clans
Turco-Mongol

Notes

References

Citations

Sources 

 Atwood, C. P. Encyclopedia of Mongolia and the Mongol Empire.
 Crossley, Pamela Kyle. A Translucent Mirror.
 Franke, Herbert; Twitchett, Denis; Fairbank, John King. The Cambridge History of China: Alien Regimes and Border States, 907-1368.
 "The Genetic Legacy of the Mongols". American Journal of Human Genetics, 72.
 Halperin, Charles J. (1985). Russia and the Golden Horde: The Mongol Impact on Medieval Russian History. Indiana University Press. . .
 Heirman, Ann; Bumbacher, Stephan Peter. The Spread of Buddhism.
 Histoire des campagnes de Gengis Khan (in French). E. J. Brill.
 Humphrey, Caroline; Sneath, David. The End of Nomadism?.
 .
 Kahn, Paul. The Secret History of the Mongols.
 Li, Gertraude Roth. Manchu: A Textbook for Reading Documents.
 
 Pegg, Carole. Mongolian Music, Dance & Oral Narrative.
 Perdue, Peter C. China Marches West.
 Sneath, David. Changing Inner Mongolia: Pastoral Mongolian Society and the Chinese State.
 Weatherford, Jack. Genghis Khan and the Making of the Modern World. Three Rivers Press.

Further reading 
Wada Sei 和田清. Tōashi Kenkyū (Mōko Hen) 東亜史研究 (蒙古編). Tokyo, 1959.
Honda Minobu 本田實信. On the genealogy of the early Northern Yüan, Ural-Altaische Jahrbücher, XXX-314, 1958.
Okada Hidehiro 岡田英弘. Dayan Hagan no nendai ダヤン・ハガンの年代. Tōyō Gakuhō, Vol. 48, No. 3 pp. 1–26 and No. 4 pp. 40–61, 1965.
Okada Hidehiro 岡田英弘. Dayan Hagan no sensei ダヤン・ハガンの先世. Shigaku Zasshi. Vol. 75, No. 5, pp. 1–38, 1966.

|-

|-

|-

|-

|-

|-

 
900 establishments
Mongolian nobility
 *01
Yuan dynasty emperors
Mongol Empire
Yuan dynasty
Ethnic groups in Mongolia
Individual Chinese surnames
Plain Yellow Banner